Dolly of the Dailies (also referred to as The Active Life of Dolly of the Dailies) is a 1914 American drama film serial directed by Walter Edwin. The serial was considered to be lost in its entirety, until a copy of the fifth episode was discovered in the New Zealand Film Archive in 2010. The rediscovered fifth episode was preserved by the Academy Film Archive in 2011. The British Film Institute's National Film and Television Archive also has a copy of episode 10.

Cast
 Mary Fuller as Dolly Desmond
 Yale Boss
 Gladys Hulette
 Charles Ogle
 Harry Beaumont
 William West
 Edwin Clarke
 Richard Neill (as Richard Neil)
 Miriam Nesbitt
 Dan Mason

Episodes
 The Perfect Truth
 The Ghost of Mother Eve
 An Affair of Dress
 Putting One Over
 The Chinese Fan
 On The Heights
 The End of The Umbrella
 A Tight Squeeze
 A Terror of The Night
 Dolly Plays Detective
 Dolly At The Helm
 The Last Assignment

See also
 List of film serials
 List of film serials by studio
 List of rediscovered films

References

External links

1914 films
1914 drama films
Silent American drama films
American silent serial films
American black-and-white films
1910s rediscovered films
1910s American films